Lambourne is a farm and hamlet in Cornwall, England. It lies west of the A3075 about a quarter of a mile (400m) south-west of Perranzabuloe.

References

Hamlets in Cornwall